Jowlandan (also Romanized as Jowlandān; also known as Mīnārabīn) is a village in Tula Rud Rural District, in the Central District of Talesh County, Gilan Province, Iran. At the 2006 census, its population was 273, in 54 families.

References 

Populated places in Talesh County